Louis Choris (1795–1828) was a German-Russian painter and explorer. He was one  of the first sketch artists for expedition research.

Biography
Louis Choris was born in Yekaterinoslav, Russian Empire, now Dnipro, Ukraine to German-Russian parents on March 22, 1795. In 1816, he visited the Pacific and the west coast of North America on board the Russian expeditionary ship Rurik, serving as an artist with the Romanzoff expedition under the command of Lieutenant Otto von Kotzebue, which was tasked with exploring a northwest passage.

In terms of his work as an artist, Choris is said to have "painted nature as he found it. The essence of his art is truth; a fresh, vigorous view of life, and an originality in portrayal." His illustrations on the Romanzoff expedition are therefore likely to faithfully represent the subjects he painted. After the voyage of the Rurik, Choris went to Paris where he issued a portfolio of his drawings in lithographic reproduction and studied in the ateliers of Gerard and Regnault. Choris worked extensively in pastels and documented the Ohlone people in the missions of San Francisco, California in 1816. Choris left France in 1827 for South America and was killed by robbers on March 22, 1828, en route to Vera Cruz, Mexico.

Choris' works are now held in public collections by such museums as the Anchorage Museum of History and Art, the Honolulu Museum of Art and the Oakland Museum of California.

Legacy

Otto von Kotzebue named the Choris Peninsula after Choris.

References

Literature
 Daum, Andreas W., German Naturalists in the Pacific around 1800: Entanglement, Autonomy, and a Transnational Culture of Expertise. In Explorations and Entanglements: Germans in Pacific Worlds from the Early Modern Period to World War I, ed. Hartmut Berghoff et al. New York, Berghahn Books, 2019, 70‒102.
 Ellis, George R., Honolulu Academy of Arts, Selected Works, Honolulu, Honolulu Academy of Arts, 1990, 181.
 Forbes, David W., Encounters with Paradise: Views of Hawaii and its People, 1778–1941, Honolulu Academy of Arts, 1992, 23–62.

Gallery

External links

 Louis Choris - American Journeys
 Foreign Views by Louis Choris

1795 births
1828 deaths
Artists from Dnipro
Ukrainian illustrators
Ukrainian explorers
Male murder victims
Artists from the San Francisco Bay Area
History of the San Francisco Bay Area
Ukrainian people of German descent